Amadou Samoura (born 21 November 2003) is a French professional footballer who plays as a forward for Le Havre.

Club career
He made his professional debut with Quevilly in a 0–0 Ligue 2 tie with Valenciennes on 6 November 2021.

Personal life
Born in France, Samoura is of Senegalese descent.

References

External links
 
 HAC Foot Profile

2003 births
Living people
People from Montivilliers
French footballers
French sportspeople of Senegalese descent
Association football forwards
Le Havre AC players
Ligue 2 players
Championnat National 3 players
Footballers from Normandy
Sportspeople from Seine-Maritime